The Chap are an English experimental pop band from North London. Their music is a mix of electronica, rock, Krautrock and pop.

History
In early 2006, they toured Europe to support their second album Ham which gained much critical acclaim including an album of the month notice in The Wire. On 19 April 2008 (26 April in the UK), they released a third album, Mega Breakfast. During 2008 and 2009, the band completed several UK and mainland European tours as well as their first US tour.

In May 2010, they released Well Done Europe, which received a rating of 7.7 from Pitchfork Media and in March 2012, they released We Are Nobody, which received a rating of 7.0.

Band members
Keith Duncan - drums, vocals, keyboards
Panos Ghikas - bass, vocals, guitar, violin, computer, keyboards
Claire Hope - keyboards, vocals, melodica
Berit Immig - keyboards, vocals (also plays in band Omo)
Johannes von Weizsäcker - guitar, vocals, cello, computer, keyboards

Berit Immig and Johannes von Weizsäcker first met when playing in the band Karamasov (Satellite Records).

Discography
 2003: The Horse (Lo Recordings)
 2005: Ham (Lo Recordings)
 2008: Mega Breakfast (Ghostly International/Lo Recordings)
 2008: Builder's Brew Mini-album (Lo Recordings)
 2010: Well Done Europe (Lo Recordings)
 2011: We Are the Best (Lo Recordings)
 2012: We Are Nobody (Lo Recordings)
 2015: The Show Must Go (Lo Recordings)
 2020: Digital Technology (Lo Recordings)

References

External links
Official website
The Chap at Myspace
The Chap at Last.fm
The Chap at Ghostly International

Musical groups established in 2000
Musical groups from London
English experimental musical groups
English electronic music groups